This is the list of episodes for The Tonight Show Starring Johnny Carson, which aired from October 1, 1962 to May 22, 1992. Lists include first-run episodes only and do not include Best of Carson rebroadcasts.

Episodes

1962–1969

1970–1979

1980–1989

1990–1992

See also
 List of The Tonight Show episodes

External links 
The Tonight Show from the Museum of Broadcast Communications website
Carson's official Tonight Show website
Register of His Papers in the Library of Congress

The Man Who Retired a June 2002 Esquire article also available here
Johnny Carson, late-night TV legend, dies at 79, a January 2005 CNN article
A profile of Carson in The New Yorker from 1978

Tonight Show Starring Johnny Carson, The
The Tonight Show Starring Johnny Carson
Tonight Show Starring Johnny Carson, The